Troy Brauntuch (born 1954 in Jersey City, New Jersey) is an American artist. He lives in Austin, Texas.

He graduated from California Institute of the Arts with a Bachelor of Fine Arts in 1975. 
He was an adjunct professor at Columbia University and currently teaches at the University of Texas.

Brauntuch has exhibited his art work at the 2006 Whitney Biennial, and in 2000 at the Modern Art Despite Modernism exhibit at The Museum of Modern Art. His work was in two group shows in 1982: documenta 7, Kassel and the Venice Biennale. In 1977, his work was in the Pictures exhibition at Artists Space.

He shows at Friedrich Petzel Gallery in New York, and Mai 36 Gallery in Zurich, Switzerland.
His work is in the Museum of Modern Art.

Awards

 Guggenheim Fellowship (2010)
 National Endowment for the Arts Grants 
 Joan Mitchell Foundation Grant (1999)

References

External links
"Troy Brauntuch", Artnet
"Artist Q&A With Troy Brauntuch", Papermag, May. 12, 2008
"Troy Brauntuch", Regular Main
"TROY BRAUNTUCH", Artforum, March 1, 2005, Yood, James

20th-century American painters
American male painters
21st-century American painters
1954 births
Artists from Jersey City, New Jersey
California Institute of the Arts alumni
Columbia University faculty
University of Texas at Austin faculty
Living people
American contemporary painters
20th-century American male artists